The Organization of the Oppressed on Earth is a group that claimed responsibility for kidnappings, bombings, and executions in Lebanon in the 1980s. It was considered a precursor to, or another name for, Islamic Jihad and Hezbollah.

Connection to Hezbollah  

The US, Israel, and Canada consider the names "Islamic Jihad Organization", "Organization of the Oppressed on Earth" and the "Revolutionary Justice Organization" to be synonymous with Hezbollah.

Jeffrey Goldberg in the New York Post wrote:

Using various names, including the Islamic Jihad Organization and the Organization of the Oppressed on Earth, Hezbollah remained underground until 1985, when it published a manifesto condemning the West, and proclaiming, ".... Allah is behind us supporting and protecting us while instilling fear in the hearts of our enemies."

Activities

Bombings  

They had claimed responsibility for a 1985 bombing attack against the Madrid offices of British Airways and Trans World Airlines.

Kidnappings 

They kidnapped 4 Jews in 1985, including Isaac Sasson the leader of the Jewish community in Lebanon and Dr. Ellie Hallaq, the community doctor.   Isaac Sasson was taken at gunpoint March 31, 1985, on his way from the Beirut International Airport, after a trip to Abu Dhabi. They murdered these abductees one-by-one.

In 1987, they kidnapped British citizen Terry Waite who was in Lebanon as a hostage negotiator.  Waite remained in captivity for 1,763 days, the first four years of which were spent in solitary confinement. He was finally released on 18 November 1991.

In 1989, they kidnapped and then later hung United States Lieutenant Colonel Richard Higgins. Higgins was a member of the United Nations Truce Supervisory Organization observer unit and was accused of spying by his captors.   A videotape was released July 31, showing his body hanging from a gallows.

References 

Hezbollah
Organizations based in Asia designated as terrorist
Organizations designated as terrorist by Canada
Islamic terrorism in Lebanon
1985 establishments in Lebanon